Dohan, sometimes known as Dohan-sur-Semois, is a village of Wallonia and a district of the municipality of Bouillon, located in the province of Luxembourg. Located in the southern Ardennes, it stands on the Semois river.

Its economy is primarily based on tourism and agriculture.

The Château de Dohan ("Dohan Castle") is a fortified farmhouse, or ferme-château.

Bouillon
Former municipalities of Luxembourg (Belgium)